Hatzegobatrachus is an extinct genus of prehistoric toad. It is sometimes considered the earliest known member of the family Bombinatoridae. It is known from the Late Cretaceous Densuş-Ciula Formation and Sard Formation of Romania, in the region that was once Hateg Island.

See also
 Prehistoric amphibian
 List of prehistoric amphibians

References

Cretaceous amphibians of Europe
Fossil taxa described in 2003
Bombinatoridae
Prehistoric amphibian genera